Adelino da Silva Pereira Cirqueira (born 6 July 1994), known as Adelino, is a Brazilian professional footballer who plays as a striker.

References

External links

futebol365 profile 

talentssports profile 

1994 births
Living people
Association football forwards
Brazilian footballers
Brazilian expatriate footballers
Brazilian expatriate sportspeople in Portugal
Expatriate footballers in Portugal
Guarani FC players
São Paulo FC players
Esporte Clube Noroeste players
Portimonense S.C. players
Campeonato Brasileiro Série B players
Liga Portugal 2 players
Batatais Futebol Clube players